Stuart Rojstaczer is an American writer, musician, and geophysicist.

He was trained as a geophysicist and was a professor at Duke University before leaving academe to pursue research into grade inflation and to write fiction and music. He performs music under the stage name Stuart Rosh with his band "the Geniuses".

Rojstaczer was born in Milwaukee, Wisconsin, to Polish-Jewish parents. He was educated in public and Orthodox Hasidic schools and later went on to receive degrees from the University of Wisconsin–Madison, University of Illinois, and Stanford University. He ascended to a professorship at Duke University, where he researched hydrology, ecology, geophysics, and geology. He published in journals such as Science, Nature, and others.

As he departed from academe, he published Gone for Good (Oxford University Press), in which he describes his point of view on the reality of elite academic institutions. He also began to write about grade inflation, to maintain a web site, gradeinflation.com, on the topic of college grading. He published articles on grading in the Teachers College Record and has appeared on NPR to discuss this topic. His writings have also appeared in The New York Times, The Washington Post, and other periodicals.

In the 2000s, he began to write and perform music professionally and to write literary fiction. He has been a Karma Foundation Annual Short Story Finalist and a National Science Foundation Young Investigator.

His novel, The Mathematician's Shiva, was published by Penguin Books in 2014.

In 2015, Rojstaczer won the 2014 National Jewish Book Award for Outstanding Debut Fiction for "The Mathematician's Shiva" The novel was shortlisted for the Ribalow Prize.

References

External links
 Stuart Rojstaczer – Official Website
 Grade Inflation: Your Questions Answered – The New York Times
 Grade Inflation: Stuart Rojstaczer: Where All Grades Are Above Average – Duke Today, webzine of Duke University
 Surprise: geologists find glaciers can suppress volcanic eruptions – UNC-CH News Services, December 8, 1998
 National Trends in Grade Inflation at American Colleges and Universities – Analyzes data from around the United States over time

Musicians from Milwaukee
Writers from Milwaukee
Jewish American composers
Living people
Duke University faculty
University of Wisconsin–Madison alumni
University of Illinois Urbana-Champaign alumni
Stanford University alumni
Year of birth missing (living people)
21st-century American Jews